Casper van der Merwe (born 8 December 1946) is a South African cricketer. He played in thirteen first-class and three List A matches for Boland from 1980/81 to 1982/83.

See also
 List of Boland representative cricketers

References

External links
 

1946 births
Living people
South African cricketers
Boland cricketers